"Loving You Has Made Me Bananas" is a 1968 hit novelty song composed and performed by Guy Marks.  It parodies big band broadcasts of the era with absurd lyrics.

It was first released in 1968 on ABC Records as a single with "Forgive Me My Love" on the B-side, some two years after "Winchester Cathedral" had triggered a revival of this musical form that had fallen out of fashion in the 1950s. It was also released in a stereo LP in 1968 (ABC Records ABCS-648) with additional legitimate 1930s and 1940s hits sung in the same style ("Object of My Affection", "Painted Tainted Rose", "Ti-Pi-Tin", "This Is Forever", "Amapola", "Postage Machine", "Careless", "Little Shoemaker", "Forgive Me My Love" and "Little Sir Echo").

The single was re-released in 1978, reaching No. 25 in the UK Singles Chart.

References

1968 singles
Novelty songs
1968 songs